Marcgravia polyadenia is a species of plant in the Marcgraviaceae family. The flowering vine is endemic to Ecuador.

Ecology
The plant's natural habitat is subtropical or tropical moist lowland forests.

The green-crowned brilliant hummingbird feeds at the large inflorescences of the Marcgravia polyadenia vines.

References 

polyadenia
Endemic flora of Ecuador
Data deficient plants
Bird food plants
Vines
Taxonomy articles created by Polbot